Edson Omar Vásquez Ortega (born August 15, 1989) is a Colombian football midfield. He currently plays for Llaneros FC.

Club career
Vásquez is a product of the Millonarios youth system and played with the Millonarios first team since November, 2007
.

Statistics (Official games/Colombian Ligue and Colombian Cup)

(''As of December 17, 2012)

References

External links
 
 
 

1989 births
Living people
Colombian footballers
Colombian expatriate footballers
Millonarios F.C. players
Girardot F.C. footballers
Querétaro F.C. footballers
La Equidad footballers
Patriotas Boyacá footballers
Águilas Doradas Rionegro players
Llaneros F.C. players
Categoría Primera A players
Categoría Primera B players
Liga MX players
Bolivian Primera División players
Expatriate footballers in Mexico
Expatriate footballers in Bolivia
Colombian expatriate sportspeople in Mexico
Colombian expatriate sportspeople in Bolivia
Association football midfielders
People from Norte de Santander Department